The SARS conspiracy theory began to emerge during the severe acute respiratory syndrome (SARS) outbreak in China in the spring of 2003, when Sergei Kolesnikov, a Russian scientist and a member of the Russian Academy of Medical Sciences, first publicized his claim that the SARS coronavirus is a synthesis of measles and mumps. According to Kolesnikov, this combination cannot be formed in the natural world and thus the SARS virus must have been produced under laboratory conditions. Another Russian scientist, Nikolai Filatov, head of Moscow's epidemiological services, had earlier commented that the SARS virus was probably man-made.

However, independent labs concluded these claims to be premature since the SARS virus is a coronavirus, whereas measles and mumps are paramyxoviruses. The primary differences between a coronavirus and a paramyxovirus are in their structures and method of infection, thus making it implausible for a coronavirus to have been created from two paramyxoviruses.

The widespread reporting of claims by Kolesnokov and Filatov caused controversy in many Chinese internet discussion boards and chat rooms. Many Chinese believed that the SARS virus could be a biological weapon manufactured by the United States, which perceived China as a potential threat.
The failure to find the source of the SARS virus further convinced these people and many more that SARS was artificially synthesised and spread by some individuals and even governments. Circumstantial evidence suggests that the SARS virus crossed over to humans from Asian palm civets ("civet cats"), a type of animal that is often killed and eaten in Guangdong, where SARS was first discovered.

Supporters of the conspiracy theory suggest that SARS caused the most serious harm in mainland China, Hong Kong, Taiwan and Singapore, regions where most Chinese reside, while the United States, Europe and Japan were not affected as much. However, the highest mortality from SARS outside of China occurred in Canada where 43 died. Conspiracists further take as evidence the idea that, although SARS has an average mortality rate of around 10% around the world, no one died in the United States from SARS. However, there were only 8 confirmed cases out of 27 probable cases in the US (10% of 8 people is less than 1 person).  Regarding reasons why SARS patients in the United States experienced a relatively mild illness, the U.S. Centers for Disease Control has explained that anybody with fever and a respiratory symptom who had traveled to an affected area was included as a SARS patient in the U.S., even though many of these were found to have had other respiratory illnesses.

Tong Zeng, an activist with no medical background, authored the book The Last Defense Line: Concerns About the Loss of Chinese Genes, published in 2003. In the book, Zeng suggested researchers from the United States may have created SARS as an anti-Chinese bioweapon after taking blood samples in China for a longevity study in the 1990s. The book's hypothesis was a front-page report in the Guangzhou newspaper Southern Metropolis Daily.

Coronaviruses similar to SARS have been found in bats in China, suggesting they may be their natural reservoir.

See also
 Misinformation related to the COVID-19 pandemic

References

External links
ParaPundit: Conspiracy theories in China
San Francisco Chroncle's report
SARS Crisis: Don't Rule Out Linkages To China's Biowarfare Article by Richard D. Fisher Jr. for The Jamestown Foundation.
People's Daily's report on Tong Zeng's book (simplified Chinese)
Singapore's Lianhe Zaobao reports the conspiracy theory and Hou's assertion

conspiracy theory
Medical-related conspiracy theories
Anti-American sentiment in China
Pseudohistory
Biological warfare
China–United States relations
Allegations
Conspiracy theories in China
Pseudoscience
Conspiracy Theory